Renata Voráčová was the defending champion, but lost in the first round against Tatjana Malek.
Alexandra Cadanțu won the title, defeating Mariana Duque 6–4, 6–3 in the final.

Seeds

Main draw

Finals

Top half

Bottom half

References
 Main Draw
 Qualifying Draw

Torneo Internazionale Regione Piemonte - Singles
Torneo Internazionale Regione Piemonte